Ronald Tracy Walker (July 27, 1939 – October 14, 2019) was a Republican member of the North Carolina General Assembly who represented the state's ninety-fourth House district, including constituents in Wilkes county.  A retired human resources manager from Wilkesboro, North Carolina, Walker served four terms in the state House.

In 1996, Walker was the Republican nominee for North Carolina Commissioner of Labor but lost the election to incumbent Harry Payne, a Democrat.

He died on October 14, 2019, at age 82.

Electoral history

2006

2004

2002

2000

References

|-

|-

1939 births
2019 deaths
People from Wilkesboro, North Carolina
21st-century American politicians
Republican Party members of the North Carolina House of Representatives